She Used to Be Mine may refer to:
"She Used to Be Mine" (Brooks & Dunn song), from their 1993 album Hard Workin' Man
"She Used to Be Mine" (Sara Bareilles song), from the 2016 musical Waitress and her 2015 album What's Inside: Songs from Waitress
"My Best Friend's Girl" (song), by The Cars, from their 1978 self-titled debut album